Xeromphalina campanella is a species of mushroom. The common names of the species include the golden trumpet and the bell Omphalina. The genus name Xeromphalina means "little dry navel" and campanella means "bell-shaped", respectively describing the mature and young shapes of the pileus, or cap. The mushroom is also called fuzzy-foot.

Description
The fruit body of X. campanella has a small umbrella-shaped cap, about .5–2 cm wide. The thin brown stalk is 1–5 cm long and 1–3 mm wide, yellow at the apex, reddish brown below, with brown or yellow hairs at the base. The gills are pale yellow to pale orange. The spore print is pale buff. When the species is young, their caps are bell-shaped. As they mature, the outer part of the cap expands and rises which leaves the center depressed, resembling a navel.

Edibility
Although the species is not poisonous, the mushrooms are small and bitter tasting with no value as edibles. David Arora suggests that the mushroom is a small morsel that is hardly worth eating. Despite many authors calling the mushroom inedible, author  Bill Russell knows people that eat the mushroom frequently.

Habitat
The fruiting occurs in clumps or very dense clusters on decaying logs, stumps, and woody debris of coniferous trees. The species is commonly found in North America. At times, the species almost entirely covers old tree stumps. The species can be found in any wet season of the year.

Similar species
Xeromphalina campanelloides is distinguishable via microscopic features. Xeromphalina kauffmanii resembles the species, but has a more yellow cap and grows on decaying wood of broad-leaved trees. Xeromphalina brunneola also resembles the species, but has smaller, narrowly elliptical spores, and differs in odor, taste, and cap color. Xeromphalina cauticinalis, X. cornui, and X. fulvipes are also similar.

References

Fungi of North America
Mycenaceae
Taxa named by August Batsch